King's Golden Jubilee may refer to:
 Golden Jubilee of George III in 1809
 Golden Jubilee of Carl XVI Gustaf in 2023